Ángel Gaud González is one of the longest serving professors at the  University of Puerto Rico at Mayaguez. For more than 50 years as professor of Physics, Math and Science. Born in Mayagüez, Puerto Rico. He studied Mechanical engineering, M.S. (1968) University of Puerto Rico at Mayagüez and J.D. (1980)
Pontifical Catholic University of Puerto Rico. Has been a lecturer and visiting professor at several institutions of higher education as: Pontifical Catholic University of Puerto Rico [1999]. He is secretary of the Alumni Office of the University of Puerto Rico at Mayaguez[2011]. Multifaceted Leader in Sports, Music, Military, Arts and humanitarian.
Arts:
Musician Trumpet and Bass guitar . Orchestra Director Son D' Ki (Current), Chairman of Mayagüezano Song Festival, Homage to their Composers Inc., and Director of Art and Culture of Club de Oficinistas of Mayaguez, Inc. [2011].
Military:
State Guard, Lieutenant Colonel [Retired] Distinguished Veteran Awarded by the Senate of Puerto Rico on November 7, 2008. Signed by Kenneth McClintock Hernandez / President and Luis R. Ramos Gonzalez / Attorney. American Legion Commander Veteran of Mayagüez [2011].
Health and Emergency:
National Emergency Training Center, 1997 Certificate by FEMA, Disaster Assistance, Hazardous Materials, Emergency Preparedness, Emergency Program Manager, and Radiological Emergency Management.
Sports:
District Administrator Program No. 9 Little League of Puerto Rico, November 23, 1993. Technical Director of Latin American Baseball Series XXI 1995.
Certificate of Parliamentary Procedure April 6, 1991.
President of the festival of Kings of the League of Paris in Mayaguez, also helped in the Mango Festival in Mayagüez. He was active in various professional engineering societies. Married for more than 56 years to Mrs. Elsie Velez. They have 3 children and 7 grandsons.
The Physics Department Building now bears his name.

References 

 http://www.uprm.edu/fisica/personal.php
 Rivera, Carlos M. (2005). Leadership: Past, resent & Future, p. vi. Power Publications, Inc.; 1 edition (March 2005), USA. .
 http://sondki.com/
 http://mayaguezsabeamango.com/
http://www.oslpr.org/files/docs/%7BEAB9C8A4-6CC4-4877-B4B2-D6FA73CD7E4C%7D.doc

Puerto Rican scientists
Living people
People from Mayagüez, Puerto Rico
Pontifical Catholic University of Puerto Rico alumni
1930 births